Htun Htun Oo (also spelt Tun Tun Oo) is the Attorney General of Myanmar (Burma). He previously served as Deputy Attorney General in President Thein Sein's Cabinet.

He also served as chairman to draft two of the four controversial bills designed to regulate religious conversion and population-control measures in Myanmar.

References

Living people
21st-century Burmese lawyers
Attorneys general of Burma
Year of birth missing (living people)